Pt. Neki Ram Sharma Govt. College, Rohtak provides quality education of Post Graduate,Graduate and Honours level to both boys and girls. This College was established as Govt. Intermediate College in 1927. It was upgraded to a Govt. Degree College in 1944. The administrative control of this College was taken over by Maharashi Dayanand University, Rohtak in July 1980. The College was named as UniverstCollege, Rohtak. The Haryana State Government took back the administrative control of this College in April 2006. Now this College is known as Pandit Neki Ram Sharma Government College, Rohtak. The College has made a steady progress in academic, cultural and intellectual fields.
eki Ram Sharma Government College is a degree-granting college in Rohtak, Haryana, India. It is affiliated to Maharshi Dayanand University. Its foundation year is 1927.

References

External links
 

1927 establishments in India
Education in Rohtak
Educational institutions established in 1927
Universities and colleges in Haryana
Maharshi Dayanand University